Aetius was a 1st- or 2nd-century AD doxographer and Eclectic philosopher.

Works
None of Aetius' works survives today, but he solves a mystery about two major compilations of philosophical quotes. There are two extant books named De Placita Philosophorum (Περὶ τῶν ἀρεσκόντων φιλοσόφοις φυσικῶν δογμάτων, "Opinions of the Philosophers") and Eclogae Physicae (Ἐκλογαὶ φυσικαὶ καὶ ἠθικαί, "Physical and Moral Extracts"). The first of these is Pseudo-Plutarch and the second is by Stobaeus. They are clearly both abridgements of a larger work. Hermann Diels, in his great Doxographi Graeci (1879), discovered that the 5th-century CE theologian Theodoret had full versions of the quotes which were shortened in the abridgements. This means that Theodoret had managed to procure the original book which Pseudo-Plutarch and Stobaeus had shortened. He calls this book "Aetiou tên peri areskontôn sunagôgên (Ἀετίου περὶ τῶν Ἀρεσκόντων Συναγωγήν)" and therefore we ascribe the original Placita to Aetius.

Diels claimed that Aetius himself was merely abridging a work which Diels (1879) called Oldest Tenets or, in Latin, Vetusta Placita. Unlike Aetius, whose existence is attested by Theodoret, the Vetusta Placita is Diels' invention and is generally disregarded by modern classicists

Quotes which are ascribed to Aetius in scholarly essays were actually discovered in either the abridgements of Pseudo-Plutarch or Stobaeus, or Theodoret's full quotes in rare cases, or finally one of several ancient authors who provided corrections to misquotes in one of these works.

References

Sources

Further reading
 Mansfeld, Jaap, & Runia, David T. Aëtiana: The Method and Intellectual Context of a Doxographer, I: The Sources (Leiden: E. J. Brill, 1997) (Philosophia Antiqua, 73); Idem, Aëtiana: The Method and Intellectual Context of a Doxographer, II/1-2; The compendium (Leiden: E. J. Brill, 2009) (Philosophia Antiqua, 114); Idem, Aëtiana: The Method and Intellectual Context of a Doxographer. Vol. 3, Studies in the Doxographical Traditions of Ancient Philosophy (Leiden/Boston:  Brill, 2009) (Philosophia antiqua, 118).
 Bottler, Heike: Pseudo-Plutarch und Stobaios: Eine synoptische Untersuchung (Hypomnemata 198), Göttingen 2014,

External links
 John Burnet's Early Greek Philosophy: Section B: Note on the Sources
 
 Complete text of the Placita: Greek, and French

2nd-century philosophers
Year of birth unknown
Year of death unknown
1st-century philosophers